Josef Imbach may refer to:

 Josef Imbach (athlete) (1894–1964), Swiss sprinter
 Josef Imbach (theologian) (born 1945), Swiss theologian